Charikleia Kastritsi (Χαρίκλεια Καστρίτση, born ) is a Greek female weightlifter, competing in the 58 kg category and representing Greece at international competitions. 

She participated at the 2004 Summer Olympics in the 58 kg event. She competed at world championships, most recently at the 2007 World Weightlifting Championships.

Major results

References

External links
 
 http://www.the-sports.org/charikleia-kastritsi-weightlifting-spf7562.html

1983 births
Living people
Greek female weightlifters
Weightlifters at the 2004 Summer Olympics
Olympic weightlifters of Greece
Place of birth missing (living people)
World Weightlifting Championships medalists
Sportspeople from Athens
21st-century Greek women